Alexandra Manly (born 28 February 1996) is an Australian professional racing cyclist, who joined the Women's WorldTour team  in 2022.

Manly qualified for the Tokyo 2020 Olympics. She was a member of the Women's pursuit team. The team consisting of Ashlee Ankudinoff, Georgia Baker, Annette Edmondson, Alexandra Manly, Maeve Plouffe finished fifth.

Manly was born in Kalgoorlie, Western Australia, but now lives in South Australia. Before taking up cycling, Manly had previously tried basketball, cross country running, netball, hockey, tennis, javelin, and steeple chase.

Major results

Road

2013
 National Junior Championships
1st  Time trial
3rd Road race
 Oceania Junior Championships
2nd  Time trial
2nd  Road race
 UCI Junior World Championships
3rd  Time trial
8th Road race
2014
 Oceania Junior Championships
1st  Time trial
4th Road race
 National Junior Championships
2nd Road race
3rd Time trial
 4th Time trial, UCI Junior World Championships
2015
 Oceania Road Championships
2nd  Under-23 time trial
2nd  Under-23 road race
5th Time trial
8th Road race
2017
 National Under-23 Championships
1st  Time trial
1st  Road race
2018
 National Under-23 Championships
1st  Time trial
1st  Road race
2022
 1st Overall Thüringen Ladies Tour
1st Points classification
1st Stages 1, 3, 4 & 6
 3rd  Team relay, UCI Road World Championships
 3rd Overall Tour of Scandinavia 
 1st Stage 4 
 4th Overall The Women's Tour
 10th Brabantse Pijl
2023
1st Stage 2 Tour Down Under

Track

2013
 1st  Team pursuit (with Samantha Fromentein & Stacey Riedel), National Junior Championships
2014
 UCI Junior World Championships
1st  Individual pursuit
1st  Team pursuit
 National Junior Championships
1st  Individual pursuit
3rd Points race
 3rd Team pursuit, National Championships
2015
 1st Team pursuit, 2014–15 UCI Track Cycling World Cup, Cali
 National Championships
2nd Team pursuit
3rd Points race
2016
 1st  Team pursuit, Oceania Championships
 1st  Madison, National Championships
2017
 1st  Team pursuit, National Championships
 UCI World Championships
2nd  Team pursuit
3rd  Madison
2018
 1st  Team pursuit, Commonwealth Games
 National Championships
1st  Team pursuit
2nd Omnium
2nd Madison
2019
 1st  Team pursuit, UCI World Championships

See also
List of 2015 UCI Women's Teams and riders

References

External links
 

1996 births
Living people
Australian female cyclists
People from Kalgoorlie
Cyclists at the 2018 Commonwealth Games
Commonwealth Games medallists in cycling
Commonwealth Games gold medallists for Australia
UCI Track Cycling World Champions (women)
Olympic cyclists of Australia
Cyclists at the 2020 Summer Olympics
Sportswomen from Western Australia
Cyclists from Western Australia
Medallists at the 2018 Commonwealth Games